Rachel Biddulph Henning (1826–1914) was born in England. In 1854, she went to Australia but returned to England in 1856 due to homesickness and the hot climate. However, in 1861, she returned to Australia, this time travelling on the SS Great Britain. During this voyage she kept a diary. Highlights included the discovery of a stowaway who became the surgeon's assistant and a visit to the engine room in her long Victorian dress. Following this trip, she settled in Australia permanently. She first lived with her brother and sister on their property in Queensland, but married in 1866 and later moved to a property at Figtree on the New South Wales south coast near Wollongong (see Joseph Davis "Rachel Henning and Deighton Taylor in Illawarra 1853-1896" at the link below).

Henning's descriptive letters, mainly addressed to her sister in England, provide a detailed account of nearly 30 years of pioneering life in Australia. The letters were first published by The Bulletin in 1951 and 1952; in 1963, they were collected in book form and published by Angus and Robertson, with a foreword and illustrations by Norman Lindsay. Literary critic Debra Adelaide writes that "they are valued for their vivid portrayal of station life in the second half of the nineteenth century and for her own humour and frankness about the life she led".

Henning's Letters is one of the best examples in English of the way in which letters can overlap with fiction.

References

Further reading
 
 
  Australian Dictionary of Biography entry
  Full text of her letters at Project Gutenberg Australia
 Rachel Henning and Deighton Taylor in Illawarra 1853-1896 

1826 births
1914 deaths
Australian people of English descent
Australian women writers
Australian writers
Women letter writers
19th-century Australian women
20th-century Australian women